Uncle Ted may refer to:

People
Edwin Raub, horror host who presented under the stage name "Uncle Ted".
Ted Nugent, American rock musician.
Ted Stevens, American politician from Alaska
Ted Kaczynski, American domestic terrorist and former mathematician

Fictional characters
Uncle Ted, an electric organ powerup in the video game Putty.
Uncle Ted, from the 1996 movie Bad Moon.
Uncle Ted, from the 2009 film My Son, My Son, What Have Ye Done?.
Uncle Ted, from the animated series Bobby's World.
Uncle Ted, from the British TV serial The Buddha of Suburbia.